Cabeza is a Spanish and Galician word meaning 'head'.

Cabeza may also refer to:

 Cabeza (wasp), genus of wasps in the family Eulophidae

Persons
 Richard Cabeza, Swedish musician
 Álvar Núñez Cabeza de Vaca, Spanish explorer of the New World

Arts, entertainment, and media
 "La cabeza", a 2019 song by DJ Hamida, Nassi and Imen Es

See also
 
 Cabezas (disambiguation)